Thomas Minor (23 April 1608 – 23 October 1690) was a founder of New London and Stonington, Connecticut, United States, and an early colonial New England diarist.

Early life and marriage
Minor was born in Chew Magna, in Somerset, England, on April 23, 1608, to Clement Miner (born Feb 23, 1585;
died Mar 31, 1640). In 1629, he emigrated to Salem, Massachusetts, aboard the Lyon's Whelp. In the introduction of The Diary of Thomas Minor, Stonington, Connecticut 1653-1684, it states the name of the ship was the Arabella. It landed in Salem, Massachusetts on June 14, 1630. He quickly moved to Watertown, and then on to Charlestown, after typhus fever broke out in Salem.

In Charlestown, Minor met Grace Palmer, whom he married in 1634. She was the daughter of Walter Palmer. The couple eventually had seven sons and three daughters.

John Minor (1635-1719)

Clement Minor (1639-1700)

Thomas Miner (1640-1662)

Ephraim Miner (1642-1724)

Joseph Miner (1644-1712)

Manassah Minor (1647-1728)

Ann Minor (1648-?)

Marie Minor (1651-1660)

Samuel Minor (1652-1682)

Hannah Minor (1655-1721)

In 1636, the Minors moved to Hingham.

Settling Stonington
After several years in Hingham, the family moved south to the Wequetequock area of present-day Stonington, Connecticut, where Minor and his son Ephraim helped found the Road Church.

In about 1653, Minor bought land west of Stonington, across Quiambaug Cove near present-day Mystic, and built a house for his family. Around this time he began one of the few diaries to survive 17th-century New England. It covers the years 1653 to 1684 and was published in book form in 1899.

Minor was active in public affairs in both New London and Stonington. He was commissioned as the captain of the Stonington militia company in 1665.  Both he and his sons served during King Philip's War.  His son, Lieutenant Thomas Minor, appears on the list of Connecticut men who volunteered for service in King Philip's War who were the original proprietors of Voluntown, Connecticut.

Genealogy
Between 1683 and 1684, Minor contracted with an individual in England to investigate his genealogical line and determine how his surname was historically spelled (Minor versus Miner). The response he received is a classic example of fraudulent genealogy. The pedigree and family coat of arms sent back to Minor were proven to be mostly falsified in a 1984 study published by the New England Historic Genealogical Society.

Death
Minor and his wife died three months apart in 1690 and are buried together in Stonington's Wequetequock Cemetery. The founders monument in Stonington has one side dedicated to him.

Notable descendants
Notable descendants include:
 Ned Lamont
 Ulysses S. Grant
 William T. Minor
 Thomas T. Minor
 William Chester Minor
 Michael D. Miner
 John D. Rockefeller
 Lydia M. Miner
 Jason A. Miner
 Dave Minor
 Alonzo Ames Miner

References

External links
 Stonington Historical Society – In Search of the First Settlers
 Original Stonington settlements c. 1651 – map

1608 births
1690 deaths
American city founders
People from Somerset
American Puritans
King Philip's War
American diarists
People from Mystic, Connecticut
English emigrants
Burials in Connecticut